Bernardo Arias (born 20 August 1942) is a former Peruvian cyclist. He competed in the team time trial at the 1972 Summer Olympics.

References

External links
 

1942 births
Living people
Peruvian male cyclists
Olympic cyclists of Peru
Cyclists at the 1972 Summer Olympics
Place of birth missing (living people)
20th-century Peruvian people